In the domain name system (DNS), .sch is a second-level domain used by several countries, including Iran (.ir), Saudi Arabia (.sa), and the United Kingdom (.uk), as a subdomain to represent primary and secondary schools.  In the United Kingdom, these are linked with area names, such that schools have a domain name of the form www.<schoolname>.<areaname>.sch.uk.  It is up to the individual countries whether to use this classification system, and whether a given organization qualifies as a school.

External links
List of all top-level domains with their policies for second and third level domains at Mozilla, accessed February 10, 2020
Nominet UK .sch information

Second-level domains